Julian Emilio Vitug Ejercito (born January 15, 1996), more popularly known by his screen name Julian Estrada, is a Filipino DJ and actor. He is a talent of ABS-CBN and Star Magic and part of the Ejercito-Estrada clan. He was born to Senator Jinggoy Estrada, a politician and former actor who has been a member of the Senate of the Philippines since 2004, and to Ma. Presentacion "Precy" Vitug.

Filmography

Awards and recognitions

References

External links

Filipino male child actors
Filipino people of Kapampangan descent
Julian
Julian
Living people
1997 births
Star Magic